Rijau is a Local Government Area in Niger State, Nigeria. Its headquarters are in the town of Rijau.

It has an area of 3,196 km and a population of 176,053 at the 2006 census.

The postal code of the area is 923.

References

Local Government Areas in Niger State